Cyperus fuscovaginatus is a species of sedge that is endemic to Zambia.

The species was first formally described by the botanist Georg Kükenthal in 1921.

See also
 List of Cyperus species

References

fuscovaginatus
Taxa named by Georg Kükenthal
Plants described in 1921
Flora of Zambia